Latafat Ali Khan (20 September 1921 – 23 November 2010) was an Indian politician. He was a member of 4th Lok Sabha from Muzaffarnagar constituency in Uttar Pradesh.

Khan was born in Mathra village in Muzaffarnagar on 20 September 1921. He died in Noida, Uttar Pradesh on 23 November 2010, at the age of 89.

References

1921 births
2010 deaths
Communist Party of India politicians from Uttar Pradesh
India MPs 1967–1970
Lok Sabha members from Uttar Pradesh